This is a list of the first women lawyer(s) and judge(s) in Ohio. It includes the year in which the women were admitted to practice law (in parentheses). Also included are women who achieved other distinctions such becoming the first in their state to graduate from law school or become a political figure.

Firsts in Ohio's history

Law School 

 First female law graduate: Clara Millard in 1911

Lawyers 

First female: Nettie Cronise Lutes (1873) 
First African American female: Daisy D. Perkins (1919)

State judges 
 First female Chief Justice of the Supreme Court of Ohio: Maureen O'Connor (elected as associate justice in 2002 and 2008, elected as chief justice in 2010 and 2016.) Retirement 2022 by constitutional age limit.
 First female: Florence E. Allen (1914) in 1920
 First female (Supreme Court of Ohio): Florence E. Allen (1914) in 1922 
 First female (municipal court): Mary B. Grossman (1912) in 1923  
 First African American female: Lillian W. Burke (1951) in 1969 
 First African American female (elected): C. Ellen Connally (1971) in 1979  
 First openly lesbian female: Mary Wiseman (1998) in 2007 
 First Hispanic American (female) (appellate court): Keila Cosme in 2009  
 First African American female (Supreme Court of Ohio): Yvette McGee Brown in 2011 
 First (Asian American) female (Fourth District Court of Appeals): Marie Hoover (1994) in 2012 
 First Egyptian American female: Sherrie Mikhail Miday (2001) in 2016
 First Latino American female (elected): Marilyn Zayas-Davis in 2016 
 First African American female (Supreme Court of Ohio): Melody J. Stewart in 2018
 First African American female (Tenth District Court of Appeals): Laurel Beatty Blunt in 2018

Federal judges 
First female (U.S. Court of Appeals - Sixth Circuit):  Florence E. Allen (1914) in 1934 
First female (federal district court): Ann Aldrich (1950) in 1980  
First African American female (U.S. District Court for the Northern District of Ohio): Benita Y. Pearson (1995)

Attorney General of Ohio 

 First female: Betty Montgomery from 1995-2003

Assistant Attorney General 

 First African American female: Helen Elsie Austin (1930) in 1937

United States Attorney 

 First African American female (Northern District of Ohio): Marisa T. Darden was confirmed in 2022, though she withdrew before she officially took office

Assistant United States Attorney 

 First female (Northern District of Ohio): Carole S. Rendon

Ohio State Bar Association 

 First female admitted to bar: Clara Millard (1911) 
 First female president: Kathleen Burke from 1993-1994

Firsts in local history

 Clam M. Millard: First woman admitted to the Bar in Northwest Ohio [Allen County, et al.]
 Jazmin Torres-Lugo: First Latino American female elected as a judge in Northeast Ohio [Ashland County, et al.]
 Terri Kohlrieser: First female to serve as a Judge of the Common Pleas Court in Allen County, Ohio (2018)
 Megan Bickerton: first female common pleas judge in Columbiana County, Ohio (2018)
 Thelma F. Lowe (1943): First female lawyer in Coshocton, Ohio [Coshocton County, Ohio]
 Mary P. Spargo (1885): First female lawyer in Cleveland, Ohio [Cuyahoga County, Ohio]
 Florence E. Allen (1914): First female to serve as Cuyahoga County's Assistant Prosecuting Attorney
 Edna Smith Shalala: First female of Syrian-Lebanese descent to practice law in Cleveland, Ohio
 Evelyn Lundberg Stratton: First female elected as a Judge of the Franklin County Common Pleas Court in Ohio (1988)
 Katherine (Kay) Lias: First female elected as a Judge of the Franklin County Common Pleas Court, Division of Domestic Relations and Juvenile Branch, Franklin County, Ohio (1988)
 Yvette McGee Brown: First African American female elected to serve as a Judge of the Franklin County Court of Common Pleas
 Tracie Hunter: First African American (female) juvenile court judge in Hamilton County, Ohio
 Nee Fong: First Asian American female lawyer in Cincinnati, Ohio [Hamilton County, Ohio]
 Verna Williams: First African American (female) to serve as the Dean of University of Cincinnati College of Law (2017)
 Vadae G. Meekison (1907): Reputed to be the first female lawyer in Henry County, Ohio
 Michelle Miller: First female judge in Jefferson County, Ohio (2014)
 Elaine Mayhew (1949): First female lawyer in Knox County, Ohio. She would later become a judge.
 Addie Nye Norton: First female probate judge in Lake County, Ohio (1920)
 Irene A. Lennon (1930): First female lawyer in Lake County, Ohio. She was also the first female to serve as the President of the Lake County Bar Association in Illinois (1950).
 Francine Bruening:  First female elected as the Judge of Common Pleas in Lake County, Ohio  (1991)
 Karen Lawson: First female to serve as the Juvenile Court Judge in Lake County, Ohio (2008)
 Christen N. Finley: First female common pleas judge in Lawrence County, Ohio (2018)
 Jennifer L. (Amos) Chesrown: First female judge in Licking County, Ohio
 Maude May Marsh Washburn (1894): First female lawyer in Lorain County, Ohio
 Geraldine Macelwane: First female to serve as a Judge of the Toledo Municipal Court (1952) as well as a Judge of the Lucas County Court of Common Pleas (1956), Ohio
 Julia Bates: First female elected as the Lucas County Prosecutor
 Alice McCollum: First female judge of the Dayton Municipal Court (1979) [Montgomery County, Ohio]
 Barb Gorman: First female to serve as a Judge of the General Division for the Montgomery County Common Pleas Court
 Helen Wallace: First female juvenile judge for Montgomery County, Ohio (2019)
 Janna Woodburn: First native-born female lawyer in Morgan County, Ohio
 Luann Cooperrider (1983): First female judge in Perry County, Ohio. She was also the first female assistant prosecutor in the county's history.
 Barbara Watson (1980): First female judge in Portage County, Ohio
 Shirley Dubetz (1954) First practicing female attorney in Portage County, Ohio.
 Cathy Goldman: First female lawyer in Mansfield, Ohio [Richland County, Ohio]
 Lulie Mackey: First female lawyer in Trumbull County, Ohio
 Pamela A. Rintala: First female judge of Trumbull County, Ohio (1994)
 Patricia McCants DeBoer (1976): First female lawyer in Newcomerstown, Ohio [Tuscarawas County, Ohio]
 Rachel Hutzel: First female to serve as the Prosecuting Attorney for Warren County, Ohio
 Carol White Millhoan: First female judge in Wayne County, Ohio
 Latecia E. Wiles: First female to serve as a Judge of Wayne County's Probate and Juvenile Court (2013)
 Molly Mack: First female judge in Wood County, Ohio (2014). She is also the first female Wood County Common Pleas Court judge (2019).

See also  

 List of first women lawyers and judges in the United States
 Timeline of women lawyers in the United States
 Women in law

Other topics of interest 

 List of first minority male lawyers and judges in the United States
 List of first minority male lawyers and judges in Ohio

References 

Lawyers, Ohio, first
Ohio, first
Women, Ohio, first
Women, Ohio, first
Women in Ohio
Lists of people from Ohio
Ohio lawyers